Narsai was Patriarch of the Church of the East during a period of schism from 524 to 537.  Unlike his opponent Elisha, who is included in the traditional list of patriarchs of the Church of the East, Narsai, has traditionally been considered an anti-patriarch.

Sources 
Brief accounts of Narsai's reign are given in the Ecclesiastical Chronicle of the Jacobite writer Bar Hebraeus (floruit 1280) and in the ecclesiastical histories of the Nestorian writers Mari (twelfth-century), Amr (fourteenth-century) and Sliba (fourteenth-century).  A long and detailed account of the schism of Narsai and Elisha is given in the Chronicle of Seert.

Narsai's patriarchate 
The following account of Narsai's reign is given by Bar Hebraeus:

Shila died after a while in office.  Then a schism arose among the bishops.  Some of them supported Elisha, the son-in-law of Shila, and consecrated him catholicus in the church of Ctesiphon; while others supported a man called Narsaï, and consecrated him catholicus in the great church of Seleucia.  Each of them began to appoint bishops for the vacant churches, and ultimately Elisha prevailed with the support of the king and shut up Narsaï in a prison.  Narsaï died shortly afterwards, and Elisha began to hope that he would be firmly established in the leadership; but the bishops assembled together and degraded him from his rank.

See also
 List of patriarchs of the Church of the East

Notes

References
 Abbeloos, J. B., and Lamy, T. J., Bar Hebraeus, Chronicon Ecclesiasticum (3 vols, Paris, 1877)
 Assemani, J. A., De Catholicis seu Patriarchis Chaldaeorum et Nestorianorum (Rome, 1775)
 Brooks, E. W., Eliae Metropolitae Nisibeni Opus Chronologicum (Rome, 1910)
 Gismondi, H., Maris, Amri, et Salibae: De Patriarchis Nestorianorum Commentaria I: Amri et Salibae Textus (Rome, 1896)
 Gismondi, H., Maris, Amri, et Salibae: De Patriarchis Nestorianorum Commentaria II: Maris textus arabicus et versio Latina (Rome, 1899)
 Scher, Addai (ed. and tr.). Histoire nestorienne inédite: Chronique de Séert. Première partie. Patrologia Orientalis 4.3 (1908), 5.2 (1910).
Scher, Addai (ed. and tr.). Histoire nestorienne inédite: Chronique de Séert. Seconde partie. Patrologia Orientalis 7.2 (1911), 13.4 (1919).

External links 

Patriarchs of the Church of the East
6th-century bishops of the Church of the East
Christians in the Sasanian Empire